Frownland may refer to:

"Frownland", a song by Captain Beefheart from his 1969 album Trout Mask Replica
Frownland, a band formed by Kurt and Patrice of Pretty Mary Sunshine
Frownland (film), a 2007 film by Ronald Bronstein